Clogestone (INN, BAN), also known as chlormadinol or as 3β,17α-dihydroxy-6-chloropregna-4,6-diene-20-one, is a steroidal progestin that was synthesized in 1964 and was investigated as a progestin-only contraceptive but was never marketed. A diacetate ester, clogestone acetate, also exists and similarly was never marketed.

See also
 Acetomepregenol
 Butagest
 Mecigestone

References

Organochlorides
Pregnanes
Progestogens
Abandoned drugs